Baseball at the 2010 Asian Games was held in Guangzhou, Guangdong, China from November 13 to 19, 2010. Only a men's competition was held. All games were played at the Aoti Baseball Field. South Korea beat Chinese Taipei 9–3 in the final to win the gold medal.

Schedule

Medalists

Draw

Pool A

*

Pool B

* Withdrew.

Squads

Results
All times are China Standard Time (UTC+08:00)

Preliminaries

Pool A

Pool B

Final round

Semifinals

Bronze medal match

Gold medal match

Final standing

References
Baseball Site of 2010 Asian Games

 
2010
2010 Asian Games events
Asian Games
2010 Asian Games